Cotton Township is one of six townships in Switzerland County, Indiana, United States. As of the 2010 census, its population was 2,040 and it contained 849 housing units.

Geography

Unincorporated towns
 Allensville at 
 East Enterprise at 
 Fairview at 
(This list is based on USGS data and may include former settlements.)

Cemeteries
The township contains these four cemeteries: Allensville, Bovard, Pelser and Stow.

Major highways
  Indiana State Road 56
  Indiana State Road 250

School districts
 Switzerland County School Corporation

Political districts
 Indiana's 9th congressional district
 State House District 68
 State Senate District 45

References
 United States Census Bureau 2008 TIGER/Line Shapefiles
 United States Board on Geographic Names (GNIS)
 IndianaMap

External links
 Indiana Township Association
 United Township Association of Indiana

Townships in Switzerland County, Indiana
Townships in Indiana